The Masterharper of Pern is a science fiction novel by the American-Irish author Anne McCaffrey. It was the fifteenth book published in the Dragonriders of Pern series by Anne or her son Todd McCaffrey.

The Masterharper of Pern was first published in 1998. It details the birth and early life of Robinton, who becomes the MasterHarper of Pern shortly before Lessa becomes Weyrwoman.

Plot summary
Robinton was rejected by his jealous father, Petiron, and spent most of his childhood with his nurturing mother. Since Robinton grew up in a very musically inclined setting, all the inhabitants helped bring him along in his journey to adulthood. Robinton composed many successful songs at a very early age and was unanimously elected Masterharper, also at a relatively young age. He tried to warn the Lord Holders of the rapacity of Lord Fax, but was unsuccessful. He was present when Lessa used her wit to provoke the duel in which Lord Fax was killed by F'lar; she had been in disguise as a drudge.

Notes

References

External links

1998 novels
1998 science fiction novels
Dragonriders of Pern books
Novels by Anne McCaffrey
Del Rey books